The Prospect Park Incline Railway was a funicular railway in the city of  Niagara Falls, New York, United States. It was built in 1845 on the United States side of the Niagara Falls at Prospect Point Park. An accident in 1907 claimed a single life and lead to the closure of this line.

The incline railway was covered and consisted of two parallel rail tracks leading from the top of the gorge to the bottom, with each track carrying an open railcar with a capacity of 15-20 passengers. The line was originally on water counterbalance principals, but was later converted to electrical operation.

Following the 1907 accident, the funicular railway was removed in 1908. In 1910, it was replaced with elevators, which operated in separate shafts drilled through the rock and opened out to a building at the base of the gorge. In 1960 the elevators were closed due to a rock fall. The elevators were replaced with the current Prospect Point Observation Tower in 1961.

See also
 Incline railways at Niagara Falls
 List of funicular railways
 Niagara Parks Commission People Mover
 Spanish Aerocar

References

Railway lines closed in 1907
Defunct New York (state) railroads
Defunct funicular railways in the United States
Rail transportation in New York (state)
Railway lines opened in 1845
Transportation in Niagara Falls, New York
Former water-powered funicular railways converted to electricity
Railway inclines in the United States
1845 establishments in New York (state)
1907 disestablishments in New York (state)